Samakhiali is a town in Kutch District of Gujarat, India.

Geography

Location
National Highway 41 starts from Samakhiyali and terminates at Narayan Sarovar. The nearest airport is Bhuj Airport. Kandla airport is to nearest from samakhiali. There is a railway station. Samkhiyali is an entrance of Kutch.

References

External links
 About Samakhiali
 Satellite map of Samakhiali

Cities and towns in Kutch district